Ambia is an unincorporated community in Lamar County, in the U.S. state of Texas.

History
A post office was established at Ambia in 1886, and remained in operation until 1905. The community derives its name from "amber", alluding to the color of the chewing tobacco used by the local men.

References

Unincorporated communities in Lamar County, Texas
Unincorporated communities in Texas